is a Japanese comedy manga spoofing the post-apocalyptic action series .  An anime television series adaptation started airing in October 2015.

Plot
The story focuses on Holy Emperor Thouzer's attempts to become friends with Kenshiro.

Characters
Souther

 is a villain from the original Fist of the North Star manga. In Hokuto no Ken: Ichigo Aji, however, he is transformed into a fun-loving version of himself who wants to party and be friends with Kenshiro. He is voiced by Banjō Ginga, who played the character in the original anime television series.

Shew

 was a former underling of Thouzer in the original series who sided against him with Kenshiro.

Rei

In the original series,  becomes an ally of Kenshiro's after the latter rescues his sister.

Juda

Shin

Fudo

Kenshiro

Toki

Raoh

Yuria

Bat

Rin

Backup Stories
In addition to the regular gag strips, each collected volume of the manga also feature a dramatic side-story at the end illustrated by Yukito the Elder.
 - A side-story focused on Mr. Heart. Published in issue #27 (February 2013) of Comic Zenon. Originally part of a collection of three Hokuto no Ken-themed short stories titled  that were published in the same issue, it predated the serialization of Ichigo Aji and does not carry its branding.
 - A side-story focused on Thouzer. Published in issue #42 (May 2014) of Comic Zenon.
 - A side-story focused on Huey and Shuren. Published in Web Comic Zenyon on October 24, 2014.
 - A side-story focused on Fudo. Published in issue #56 (July 2015) of Comic Zenon.
 - A side-story focused on Juda. Published in issue #64 (March 2016) of Comic Zenon.
 - A side-story focused on Shin. Published in issue #71 (October 2016) of Comic Zenon.

Media

Manga
The series is written by Yūshi Kawata and illustrated by Imōto Yukito, based on work by Buronson and Tetsuo Hara.  It began publication on Tokuma Shoten's Web Comic Zenyon website in 2013.

The manga had over 1 million copies in print as of June 2015.

Volume list
The series has been collected into eight tankōbon volumes.

Anime
An anime television series based on the manga was announced in the fourth tankōbon volume in June 2015.  It will be directed by Mankyū, and will begin airing on TV Tokyo, TV Osaka, and TV Aichi on 6 October 2015 as part of a DD Hokuto no Ken 2 Ichigo Aji+ program along with the second DD Fist of the North Star anime television.  The series will be simulcast worldwide by Crunchyroll.

Notes

References

External links
 Hokuto no Ken: Ichigo Aji  at Web Comic Zenyon 
 

Anime series based on manga
Fist of the North Star
Parody anime and manga
Seinen manga
Tokuma Shoten manga